W. G. Grace established his reputation in 1864 and, by 1870, was widely recognised as the outstanding player in English cricket.

Background
Grace was still 15 when the 1864 season began and was 22 when the 1870 season ended. He lived with his parents at Downend, near Bristol, throughout the period. His father, Henry Mills Grace, was the local GP and, a lifelong cricket enthusiast, had founded Mangotsfield Cricket Club in 1845 to represent several neighbouring villages including Downend. In 1846, this club merged with the West Gloucestershire Cricket Club whose name was adopted until 1867. West Gloucestershire Cricket Club was renamed Gloucestershire County Cricket Club in 1867 and achieved first-class status in 1870. Grace himself recalled: "Though the Gloucestershire County Club did not play regularly until 1870, my father frequently got up inter-county matches before that time. Those matches have never been generally chronicled, but they were played for five or six years, before first-class county cricket was established".

Grace had been "notoriously unscholarly" as a boy. Although opportunities arose, he never went to university as his father was intent upon him pursuing a medical career. But Grace was approached by both Oxford University Cricket Club and Cambridge University Cricket Club. In 1866, when he played a match at Oxford, one of the Oxford players, Edmund Carter, tried to interest him in becoming an undergraduate. Then, in 1868, Grace received overtures from Caius College, Cambridge, which had a long medical tradition. Grace said he would have gone to either Oxford or Cambridge if his father had allowed it. Instead, he enrolled at Bristol Medical School in October 1868, aged 20, and was a medical student until he finally qualified in November 1879.

Cricket in the 1860s underwent an evolutionary phase with the legalisation of overarm bowling in June 1864 and Grace himself said it was "no exaggeration to say that, between 1860 and 1870, English cricket passed through its most critical period" with the game in transition and "it was quite a revolutionary period so far as its rules were concerned". Grace had much to say about the state of the grounds in the 1860s and declared that Lord's "was in a very unsatisfactory condition". He added that wickets at The Oval were always much better than at Lord's, where the clay in the soil handicapped the groundsmen. Writing in 1899, Grace recollected that he "could go on to the pitch at Lord's and pick up a handful of small pieces of gravel"; a source of danger as a fast ball hitting one of those small stones would "fly high in the air".

In August 1863, when he was just 15, Grace was one of four family members who played for Bristol and Didcot XVIII against the All-England Eleven. He bowled well and scored 32 off the bowling of John Jackson, George Tarrant and Cris Tinley. His brother E. M. Grace took ten wickets in the match, which Bristol and Didcot won by an innings, and as a result E.M. was invited to tour Australia a few months later with George Parr's England team.

1864 English cricket season
E.M. did not return from Australia until July 1864 and his absence presented Grace with an opportunity to appear on cricket's greatest stages. He and his elder brother Henry were invited to play for the South Wales Club which had arranged a series of matches in London and Sussex, though Grace wondered humorously how they were qualified to represent South Wales. It was the first time that Grace left the West Country and he made his debut appearances at both The Oval and Lord's.

The South Wales Club's first match was at The Oval, which would become one of Grace's favourite venues, and he scored 5 and 38 against the Surrey Club in addition to taking 4 wickets. The South Wales captain wanted to drop Grace for the second match against the Gentlemen of Sussex at the Royal Brunswick Ground in Hove, but Henry Grace intervened and insisted that Grace must play as he was "recruited for both games". Henry Grace apparently informed the captain that no member of his family, including E.M. who was then the star turn, would represent South Wales in future. The captain backed down and Grace played at Hove but under great pressure to succeed. He certainly did succeed for he scored 170 and 56 not out. His innings of 170 was his first-ever century in a serious match. The third match, against Marylebone Cricket Club (MCC) was Grace's debut at Lord's and he was joined by E.M. who had just disembarked from his voyage. Grace scored 50 in the first innings only three days after his sixteenth birthday.

Grace regarded the South Wales matches as first-class fixtures and refers to them in his Cricketing Reminiscences as "really big" games. He was supported in his view by Lillywhite's Guide to Cricketers (1865 edition) which included his innings at Hove in a list called Scores of 100 or more made since 1850 in first-class matches; Grace's score was one of only six that exceeded 150. First-class status is a statistical concept and was never fully defined until an International Cricket Council (ICC) ruling in May 1947, but this does not apply retrospectively. Despite Grace's own views on the matter, his "first-class career record" was effectively created by F. S. Ashley-Cooper who produced a list of season-by-season figures to supplement Grace's obituary in the 1916 edition of Wisden Cricketers' Almanack. These figures came to be known as Grace's "traditional" career record and granted him 126 first-class centuries, a total beaten by Jack Hobbs in 1925; it was not until Roy Webber's researches in the 1950s that Ashley-Cooper's list was challenged.

Grace had less success when he played for XXII of Bath against the All-England Eleven at Sydenham Field, Lansdown as Cris Tinley dismissed him twice for a duck, one of only four recorded "pairs" in his entire career (all of them were in minor matches). He also represented West Gloucestershire in 1864, and the Clifton Cricket Club of Bristol; for the first time, he scored more than 1,000 runs in all matches.

The final word on Grace's 1864 season was a line in John Lillywhite's Cricketer's Companion (aka "Green Lilly") which said: "Mr W. G. Grace promises to be a good bat: bowls very fairly".

1865 English cricket season
His name now well known in cricketing circles, Grace played for Gentlemen of the South v Players of the South at The Oval in June 1865 when he was still only 16 but already 6 ft 2 in (1.88 m) tall and weighing 11 st (70 kg). This match is now regarded by CricketArchive as his first-class debut, although Grace himself considered the South Wales matches in 1864 to have been first-class. He bowled extremely well and had match figures of 13 for 84 using his "genuine roundarm" action. Although overarm was now legal, Grace never developed a true overarm action. At this stage of his career, he bowled fast-medium with "a kind of slinging" style. His bowling performance at The Oval earned him his first selection for the prestigious Gentlemen v Players fixture.

During this period, before the start of Test cricket in 1877, Gentlemen v Players was the most prestigious fixture in which a player could take part. This is apart from North v. South which was technically a fixture of higher quality given that the amateur Gentlemen were usually (until Grace took a hand) outclassed by the professional Players. Grace represented the Gentlemen in their matches against the Players from 1865 to 1906. It was he who enabled the amateurs to meet the paid professionals on level terms and to defeat them more often than not; his ability to master fast bowling was the key factor. Before Grace's debut in the fixture, the Gentlemen had lost 19 consecutive games; of the next 39 games they won 27 and lost only 4. In consecutive innings against the Players from 1871 to 1873, Grace scored 217, 77 and 112, 117, 163, 158 and 70. In his whole career, he scored a record 15 centuries in the fixture.

Grace's 1865 debut in the fixture did not turn the tide as the Players won at The Oval by 118 runs. He played quite well and took seven wickets in the match but could only score 23 and 12 not out. In the second 1865 match, this time at Lord's, the Gentlemen finally ended their losing streak and won by 8 wickets, but it was E. M. Grace, not W.G., who was the key factor with 11 wickets in the match. Even so, Grace made his mark by scoring 34 out of 77–2 in the second innings to steer the Gentlemen to victory.

CricketArchive recognises 5 first-class appearances in 1865 by Grace; he scored 189 runs at 27.00 with a highest score of 48 and held 5 catches. He took 20 wickets at 13.40 including the one performance of 10 wickets in a match (on his debut) with best figures of 8–40 in that match.

1866 English cricket season
In early June, while he was still only 17, Grace made his first visit to Sheffield, deputising for his brother E. M. Grace who was busy with his medical duties. The match was the last one recorded at the old Hyde Park Ground. As Grace later recalled, the ground "stood on the top of a high hill, and I began to despair of the cab ever getting to the top". He captained eighteen Colts of Nottinghamshire and Sheffield against the All-England Eleven, his team losing by an innings. Grace scored 9 in the first innings and 36 (out of 91) in the second. He said in his memoir that "the All-England team were anxious to catch the train to get away to some other part of the country and they begged me to get out", but he would not throw away his wicket. Simon Rae wrote that the game was "an important test of character which he undoubtedly passed".

Just after his eighteenth birthday in July, Grace confirmed his potential once and for all when he scored 224 not out for All-England against Surrey at The Oval. This was his maiden first-class century and Bernard Darwin described it as "characteristic of him that he made a thorough job of it" because "he was never tired of making runs and went on piling them up with a cheerful ruthlessness". All-England won the match by an innings and 296 runs, in the process effectively killing off the idea of a county team taking on the rest of England. The idea was revived, however, in 1877 when the county in question was Grace's Gloucestershire.

Grace was thenceforward the biggest name in cricket and the main spectator attraction. As Altham records, from then on "the successes came thick and fast". Grace himself recollected of the 1866 season that it was "one of my greatest scoring seasons in the early days of my cricket". He completed another large score when making 173 not out for Gentlemen of the South against Players of the South, also at The Oval, in August; and broke his bat in the process.

Grace's best bowling performance of the season was in the second Gentlemen v Players match played at The Oval where he took 7–51 in the second innings and enabled his team to win by 98 runs, the Players having won the previous match by 38 runs.

It was in August 1866 that Grace made his debut for the United South of England Eleven (USEE), with whom he was to have a long and lucrative association. E. M. Grace made his debut in the same match, which was against Southgate Cricket Club at John Walker's Ground, although he made only a couple of appearances in total. Grace's younger brother Fred Grace, then only fifteen, was to become a USEE regular. The match at Southgate was lost by 3 wickets.

Darwin summarised Grace's status at the end of the 1866 season thus: "He was no longer climbing the ladder; he had got to the top, although he was still destined to add a few more rungs to it, dizzy rungs utterly beyond anyone else's reach".

Although photographs of Grace in later life reveal that he was by then corpulent, he was a fit man in his younger days, as his feats in 1866 confirm. He was a fine athlete and an example of his physical fitness was his 440 yards hurdles victory in the National and Olympian Association meeting at Crystal Palace the day after the long innings at The Oval for All-England against Surrey. At his peak, he was 6 ft 2 in (1.88 m) tall and usually weighed about 12 st (76 kg). A non-smoker, he kept himself in condition all year round by shooting, hunting or running with the beagles as soon as the cricket season was over.

According to CricketArchive, Grace made 8 first-class appearances in 1866, scoring 581 runs at 52.81 including 2 centuries with a highest score of 224 not out and taking 9 catches. He took 31 wickets at 15.58 including 3 returns of 5 wickets in an innings with best figures of 7–51 in the Gentlemen v Players match. These figures brought him for the first time into leading positions in the seasonal first-class statistics. He was the fifth highest runscorer behind Harry Jupp, Tom Hearne, Charles Buller and Russell Walker; and second in the batting averages behind Robert Carpenter. He was a creditable 15th in the list of wicket-takers, having bowled many less deliveries than all of those above him except James Southerton. Grace took 31 wickets from 1,269 deliveries compared with the overall leader George Wootton who took 119 wickets from 4,712 deliveries, though Wootton had a more economical average.

1867 English cricket season
Grace was out of the game for much of the 1867 season due to illness and injury. He sustained a sprained ankle in early May which sidelined him until June and then was ill with scarlet fever for a whole month from 10 July to 10 August. On 26 August, when fielding in the All-England v Surrey and Sussex match, his right forefinger was split open, a wound that later reopened. As a result, he made few appearances, CricketArchive ranking 4 of them first-class. In these, he scored a modest 154 runs at 30.80 with a highest score of 75, against Middlesex at Lord's, and holding 4 catches. Even so, his bowling was outstanding as he took 39 wickets at only 7.51 with a best analysis of 8–25. He had 5 returns of 5 wickets in an innings and 2 of 10 wickets in a match. His 8–25 (11–64 in the match) was achieved in the Gentlemen v Players match at Lord's in July when his team won by 8 wickets.

Apart from a few players who bowled only a small number of overs, Grace topped the season's national bowling averages, his 7.51 being marginally better than the 7.66 of Yorkshire's new left-arm fast bowler Tom Emmett who, with 48 wickets, was making his mark in 1867. Emmett, one of the game's great characters, would become one of Grace's most respected opponents but also a good friend. But the two leading bowlers that season were Wootton and Southerton who took 142 and 132 wickets respectively, both at low averages.

1868 English cricket season
The renamed Gloucestershire County Cricket Club, still neither a formally constituted entity nor a first-class team, was in London on 25 and 26 June to play a two-day match against MCC at Lord's. The MCC team was weak, apart from George Wootton, and Gloucestershire won by 134 runs thanks to a fine performance by E.M. and a solid one by Grace.

A few days later, Grace returned to Lord's and produced "one of his most commanding performances". Playing for the Gentlemen against the Players, he scored 134, all run, out of only 201 and said later that it was "my finest innings" as the pitch was playing "queerly". In fact, the pitch was bare in places and behaved erratically with good-length balls sometimes flying over the wicketkeeper's head. Grace then took 6–50 and 4–31 (10–81 in the match) to complete a "match double". The Players had to follow on and the Gentlemen won by 8 wickets. In Simon Rae's view, "W.G. had won the most important match of the season virtually on his own".

Soon afterwards, playing at the St Lawrence Ground in Canterbury from 2 to 4 August, Grace scored two centuries in a match for South of the Thames v North of the Thames, only the second time in cricket history that this is known to have been done, following William Lambert in 1817. Grace scored 130 and 102 not out against an attack that included George Wootton, Tom Hearne and Jem Grundy. Even so, the North won by 58 runs.

Grace made a handful of appearances for the USEE including a 10 wicket victory over Southgate followed a week later by a 57 run defeat in Worcester by a Worcestershire County XXII. In the latter match, Grace was bowled cheaply in each innings by the Nottinghamshire professional fast bowler William McIntyre, who was playing as a given man for Worcestershire. As he did not yet have a first-class county to play for and did not join MCC until the following year, Grace's opportunities to play in major matches were few but, throughout his career, he was always keen to "fill in the gaps" by playing in minor matches. He was invariably a formidable opponent in these and in one game for Clifton against a Civil Service team, he hammered the bowling for 210.

According to CricketArchive, Grace made 7 first-class appearances in 1868, scoring 588 runs at 65.33 including 3 centuries with a highest score of 134 not out and holding 5 catches. He took 44 wickets at 14.52 including 5 returns of 5 wickets in an innings, with a best analysis of 7–23, and 3 times he took 10 wickets in a match. For the first time, he finished top of the national batting averages (i.e., among those who played more than a couple of matches). He was the fifth highest runscorer behind Jupp, Humphrey, Isaac Walker and James Lillywhite but they all played many more innings than he did. He was 11th in the list of wicket-takers but again he bowled relatively few overs compared with most of those above him. The leaders were Southerton (151 wickets), Willsher (113) and Wootton (106) while Tom Hearne (33 at 8.45) and Emmett (60 at 8.80) topped the averages.

Bernard Darwin wrote that 1868 was "possibly the first time in which the complaint was made that the bat held an unfair advantage over the ball". Grace was certainly the outstanding batsman that season and was consistently out-performing all other players, including E.M., and Simon Rae summarised the season by saying that Grace was "now indisputably the cricketer of the age, the Champion".

Having turned down the chance of going to Oxford University in 1866, Grace did the same when approached by Cambridge University in 1868. His explanation was that his father wanted him to pursue a medical career and Grace enrolled at Bristol Medical School on 7 October. Darwin's book contains a photograph of the enrolment register page which shows that Grace joined the General Perpetual Students for the winter session of 1868–69 and paid £23 12s 6d along with five other students.

1869 English cricket season
Marylebone Cricket Club (MCC) was particularly keen to recruit Grace and, in 1869, he became a member after being proposed by the treasurer, Thomas Burgoyne, and seconded by the secretary, Robert Allan Fitzgerald. One of the ongoing issues of 1860s cricket was a dispute between the northern professionals, led by George Parr, and Surrey, such that they refused to play at The Oval. There were even fears that the professionals would break away and form their own cricket organisation, rather as happened in rugby football in the 1890s. Grace was already the greatest attraction cricket had ever known and large crowds attended every match he played in. MCC feared the loss of its authority should Grace "throw in his lot with the professionals" so it was considered vital for them and their interests to get him onside. As it happens, the dispute was nearly over but it has been said that "MCC regained its authority over the game by hanging onto W.G.'s shirt-tails".

Grace wore MCC colours for the rest of his career, playing for them on an irregular basis until 1904, and their red and yellow hooped cap became as synonymous with him as his large black beard. He played for MCC on an expenses only basis but any hopes that the premier club had of keeping him firmly within the amateur ranks would soon be disappointed for his services were much in demand.

Grace made his MCC debut on 13 and 14 May at the Magdalen Ground in Oxford against the university team and scored 117 in his only innings as MCC won by an innings and 30 runs. Grace and George Wootton shared 19 wickets. Grace's first appearance for MCC at Lord's a few days later was against the official South, which consisted mainly of his USEE colleagues. The South won by an innings and 17 runs.

Grace scored four centuries in July, including an innings of 180 for the Gentlemen of the South v the Players of the South at The Oval. This was achieved during the highest wicket partnership involving Grace in his entire career; he shared 283 runs for the first wicket with Bransby Cooper who scored 101. Towards the end of the month, Grace represented the South in the North v. South match at Bramall Lane, his team winning by 66 runs. He scored 122 out of 173 in the first innings and then took 6–57. His batting against the formidable bowling of George Freeman, Tom Emmett and George Wootton was so good that the laconic Emmett afterwards declared Grace to be a "nonsuch" (i.e., a nonpareil) and then famously said: "He ought to be made to play with a littler bat".

According to CricketArchive, Grace made 15 first-class appearances in 1869, the most by him in a season to date. In these, he scored 1,000 runs in a season for the first time with 1,320 at 57.39 including 6 centuries with a highest score of 180 and holding 12 catches. He took 73 wickets at 16.28 including 7 returns of 5 wickets in an innings, with a best analysis of 6–10, and 1 instance of 10 wickets in a match. He finished as both highest runscorer and top of the national batting averages, Harry Jupp being the only other batsman to exceed 1,000 runs. Grace was 3rd in the list of wicket-takers behind Southerton (136 wickets) and Wootton (120) but he was well down the averages which were led by Tom Hearne (9.34) and Yorkshire fast bowler George Freeman (9.73).

1870 English cricket season
It is generally understood that Gloucestershire County Cricket Club was formally constituted in 1870, having developed from Dr Henry Grace's West Gloucestershire club. Gloucestershire acquired first-class status when its team played against Surrey at Durdham Down near Bristol on 2, 3 & 4 June 1870. With Grace and his brothers E.M. and Fred playing, Gloucestershire won that game by 51 runs and quickly became one of the best teams in England. The club was unanimously rated Champion County in 1876 and 1877 as well as sharing the unofficial title in 1873 and staking a claim for it in 1874. The Gloucestershire team in the club's inaugural match was (in batting order): E. M. Grace, W. G. Grace, Thomas Matthews (career from 1870 to 1878), Frank Townsend (1870 to 1891), Fred Grace, Charles Filgate (1869 to 1877), John Halford (1870 to 1874), John Mills (1870 only), James Bush (1870 to 1890), Robert Miles (1867 to 1879) and William Macpherson (1870 to 1871). The three Graces, Filgate and Miles had played first-class cricket previously but the other six were all debutants in this match. Surrey and Gloucestershire played a return match at The Oval in July 1870 and Gloucestershire won this by an innings and 129 runs. Grace scored 143, sharing a second wicket partnership with Townsend (89) of 234. He took eight wickets in the match but the outstanding bowler was slow left-armer Miles who took 6–86 and 6–20. George Strachan (career from 1870 to 1882) and Charles Gordon (1870 to 1875) made their first appearances for Gloucestershire.

Grace, a medical student at the time, was first on the scene when George Summers received the blow on the head that caused his death four days later. This was in the MCC v Nottinghamshire match at Lord's in June. Grace was fielding nearby when Summers was struck and took his pulse. Summers recovered consciousness and Grace advised him to leave the field. Summers did not go to hospital but it transpired later that his skull had been fractured. The Lord's pitch had a poor reputation for being rough, uneven and unpredictable all through the 19th century and many players including Grace considered it dangerous.

The United South of England Eleven (USEE) had been formed by Edgar Willsher in 1865 but the heyday of the travelling teams was over and their organisers were desperate to feature new attractions. Grace had played for them previously but he formally joined the United South in 1870 as its match organiser, for which he received payment, but he played for expenses only. His first match for the USEE in 1870 was in July against the United North of England Eleven at Lord's, but his team was well beaten by an innings. The United South survived until 1882 and was the last of the great travelling elevens to fold, its longevity due to Grace's involvement.

He scored 215 for the Gentlemen which was the first time anyone scored a double century in the Gentlemen v Players fixture. The Players managed to save this game, which was drawn, but the Gentlemen won the next one at Lord's by 4 runs. Grace scored 109 out of 187 in the first innings of a low-scoring match.

According to CricketArchive, Grace made 21 first-class appearances in 1870, easily his highest tally so far, scoring 1,808 runs at 54.78 including 5 centuries with a highest score of 215 and holding 19 catches. He took 50 wickets at 15.70 including 4 instances of 5 wickets in an innings, with a best analysis of 6–24, but he did not manage 10 wickets in a match. For the second successive season, he finished as both highest runscorer and top of the national batting averages, Ted Pooley and Harry Jupp being the only other batsmen to exceed 1,000 runs. Grace's 50 wickets placed him 9th in that list, well behind the leader Southerton who took an unprecedented 210, the first time a bowler had exceeded 200 in a season. No one else reached 100 and the other leading bowlers were Jem Shaw, Alfred Shaw, Wootton, Willsher, Freeman, James Street and Emmett. The best average was Freeman's 7.11. Grace summarised the 1870 season as "one of my best" but he declared 1871 to have been "my most successful".

Birley records that it was at this time, "scorning the puny modern fashion of moustaches", that Grace grew the enormous black beard that made him so recognisable. In addition, his "ample girth" had developed for he weighed 15 stone (95 kg) in his early twenties. Grace was a non-smoker but he enjoyed good food and wine; many years later, when discussing the overheads incurred during Lord Sheffield's profitless tour of Australia in 1891–92, Arthur Shrewsbury commented: "I told you what wine would be drunk by the amateurs; Grace himself would drink enough to swim a ship."

Footnote

• a) As described in Grace's first-class career statistics, there are different versions of Grace's first-class career totals as a result of disagreement among cricket statisticians re the status of some matches he played in.  Note that this is a statistical issue only and has little, if any, bearing on the historical aspects of Grace's career. In the infobox, the "traditional" first-class figures from Wisden 1916 (as reproduced by Rae, pp. 495–496), are given first and the "amended" figures from CricketArchive follow in parentheses. There is no dispute about Grace's Test career record and those statistics are universally recognised. See Variations in first-class cricket statistics for more information.

References

External links
 CricketArchive – W. G. Grace

Bibliography

 
 
 
 
 
 
 
 
 

English cricket seasons in the 19th century
1866